WBSG (1510 AM) is a radio station broadcasting a Spanish Variety format. Licensed to Lajas, Puerto Rico, it serves all of Puerto Rico.  The station is currently owned by Perry Broadcasting Systems.  The WBSG call letters were assigned by the Federal Communications Commission on November 22, 2006.

External links

BSG
Radio stations established in 1985
1985 establishments in Puerto Rico
Lajas, Puerto Rico